The Ada River is a perennial river of the West Gippsland catchment, located in the West Gippsland region of the Australian state of Victoria.

Course and features
The river descends  over its  course.

The Ada River sub-catchment area is managed by the West Gippsland Catchment Management Authority.

See also

 List of rivers of Australia

References

External links
 
 

West Gippsland catchment
Rivers of Gippsland (region)